Megachile giliae is a species of bee in the family Megachilidae. It was described by Theodore Dru Alison Cockerell in 1906.

References

Giliae
Insects described in 1906